Jean-François-Bertrand Delmas (3 January 1751 – 1 July 1798) was a French Revolutionary politician. He was député for Haute-Garonne in the Legislative Assembly of 1791–1792, then a member of the French National Convention, the Committee of Public Safety and the Council of Ancients, briefly presiding the Council of Ancients in 1797.  Le Moniteur Universel of 2 fructidor VI (19 August 1798) reported that he had gone mad, and it is considered unlikely that he survived beyond the end of 1798.

References

1751 births
1798 deaths
Members of the Legislative Assembly (France)
Deputies to the French National Convention
People on the Committee of Public Safety
Presidents of the National Convention